Sarangesa princei is a species of butterfly in the family Hesperiidae. It is found in eastern Kenya and northern Tanzania.

References

Butterflies described in 1896
Celaenorrhinini
Butterflies of Africa
Taxa named by Ferdinand Karsch